Arrifana may refer to one of several towns in Portugal:
 Arrifana (Aljezur)
 Arrifana (Guarda)
 Arrifana (Macedo de Cavaleiros)
 Arrifana (Santa Maria da Feira)
 Arrifana (Vila Nova de Poiares)